In Greek mythology, Eupompe (Ancient Greek: Εὐπόμπη Eupompê means 'she of good escort') was the "rosy-armed" Nereid of good festive or processional voyage. She was one of the 50 sea-nymph daughters of the 'Old Man of the Sea' Nereus and the Oceanid Doris. She may be the same with Eumolpe.

Notes

References 

 Apollodorus, The Library with an English Translation by Sir James George Frazer, F.B.A., F.R.S. in 2 Volumes, Cambridge, MA, Harvard University Press; London, William Heinemann Ltd. 1921. ISBN 0-674-99135-4. Online version at the Perseus Digital Library. Greek text available from the same website.
Hesiod, Theogony from The Homeric Hymns and Homerica with an English Translation by Hugh G. Evelyn-White, Cambridge, MA.,Harvard University Press; London, William Heinemann Ltd. 1914. Online version at the Perseus Digital Library. Greek text available from the same website.
 Kerényi, Carl, The Gods of the Greeks, Thames and Hudson, London, 1951.

Nereids